Kings MMA is a mixed martial arts (MMA) gym located in Huntington Beach, California, headed by coach Rafael Cordeiro. A successful mixed martial artist in his native Brazil, Cordeiro moved to the United States in 2008, he was previously affiliated with and was an instructor in the pioneer MMA gym Chute Boxe. In 2010, he founded the Kings MMA gym.

Coach Cordeiro and Kings MMA have been nominees for the 2014 World MMA Awards "Best coach of the year" and "Best gym of the year", respectively. Cordeiro had won the 2012 and 2016 coach of the year awards. Kings MMA is one of the top professional MMA training camps.

Notable fighters

Mixed martial arts
 Yair Rodríguez - Current Interim UFC Featherweight  Champion
 Maurício Rua - Former UFC Light Heavyweight  Champion and 2005 PRIDE Middleweight Grand Prix Champion
 Wanderlei Silva - Former PRIDE Middleweight Champion and the 2003 PRIDE Middleweight Grand Prix Tournament Champion
 Fabrício Werdum - Former UFC Heavyweight Champion
 Rafael dos Anjos - Former UFC Lightweight Champion
 Cris Cyborg - Former UFC Women's Featherweight  Champion
 Lyoto Machida - Former UFC Light Heavyweight  Champion
 Beneil Dariush
 Marvin Vettori
 Kelvin Gastelum
 Giga Chikadze
 Sean Strickland

Awards
Combat Press
2015 Coach of the Year - Rafael Cordeiro
2015 Gym of the Year

See also
List of Top Professional MMA Training Camps

References

External links
 kingsmma.com

Mixed martial arts training facilities